Landgravine Josepha of Fürstenberg-Weitra (21 June 177623 February 1848)  was princess consort of Liechtenstein as wife of Johann I Joseph, Prince of Liechtenstein. By virtue of her birth, she was member of the House of Fürstenberg.

Early life
Josepha was born at Vienna, Austria, the first daughter of Joachim Egon, Landgrave of Fürstenberg-Weitra (1749–1828) and his wife, Countess Sophia Maria of Oettingen-Wallerstein (1751–1835).

Marriage and issue
On 12 April 1792 in Vienna, she married Prince Johann Joseph of Liechtenstein (1776–1848). 
They had 14 children:
 Princess Maria Leopoldine Josepha Sophia Aemiliana (Vienna, 11 September 1793 – Vienna, 28 July 1808)
 Princess Karoline (Vienna, 2 February 1795 – died in infancy)
 Aloys II, Prince of Liechtenstein (1796–1858)
 Princess Maria Sophie Josepha (Vienna, 5 September 1798 – Vienna, 27 June 1869), married in Vienna on 4 August 1817 Vincenz Graf Esterházy von Galántha (Pressburg, 25 October 1787 – Eisgrub, 19 October 1835), without issue
 Princess Maria Josepha (Vienna, 11 January 1800 – Vienna, 14 June 1884), unmarried and without issue
 Prince Franz de Paula of Liechtenstein (1802–1887), married Countess Julia Potocka and had issue. His great-grandson would eventually become Prince Franz Joseph II.
 Prince Karl Johann of Liechtenstein (1803–1871). Married Gräfin Rosalie d'Hemricourt von Grünne and had issue.
 Princess Klothilda Leopoldina Josepha (Vienna, 19 August 1804 – Vienna, 27 January 1807)
 Princess Henriette (Vienna, 1 April 1806 – Ischl, 15 June 1886), married in Vienna on 1 October 1825 Joseph Graf Hunyady von Kethély (Vienna, 13 January 1801 – Vienna, 9 March 1869), and had issue
 Prince Friedrich Adalbert (Vienna, 22 September 1807 – Vienna, 1 May 1885), 1,018th Knight of the Order of the Golden Fleece in Austria, married at Schloss Rosegg on 15 September 1848 Johanna Sophie Christiane Löwe (Oldenburg, 24 May 1815 – Pest, 28 November 1866), without issue
 Prince Eduard Franz of Liechtenstein (1809–1864). Married Countess Honoria Choloniowa-Choloniewska and had issue.
 Prince August Ludwig Ignaz (Vienna, 22 April 1810 – Vienna, 27 May 1824)
 Princess Ida Leopoldine Sophie Marie Josephine Franziska (Eisgrub, Moravia, 12 September 1811 – Vienna, 27 June 1884), Dame of the Imperial Court, Dame of the Order of the Starry Cross, married in Vienna on 30 July 1832 Karl 4th Fürst Paar von Hartberg und Krottenstein (Brieg, Silesia, 6 January 1806 – Vienna, 17 January 1881), Hereditary Grand-Master of the Posts of the Imperial Court, and had issue
 Prince Rudolf Maria Franz Placidus (Vienna, 5 October 1816 – Vicenza, 19 June 1848), unmarried and without issue

Notes and sources
 Around 1801 Beethoven made a dedication to Josepha, his Sonata No. 13 in E-flat Major, op.27, no. 1. 

Genealogisches Handbuch des Adels, Fürstliche Häuser, Reference: 1968

1776 births
1848 deaths
Josepha
Princely consorts of Liechtenstein
Nobility from Vienna
Hereditary Princesses of Liechtenstein
18th-century Liechtenstein women
19th-century Liechtenstein women